The Liaudė is a river in central Lithuania, flowing through Kėdainiai district municipality, Radviliškis district municipality and Panevėžys district municipality. It is the right tributary of the Nevėžis river.

The river originates by the Vakarai village near Pociūnėliai. It goes to the southeastern direction passing Pociūnėliai, Žibartoniai, Paberžė, Užupė. It meets the Nevėžis 2 km from Surviliškis town.

The width of the river course is 5-8 m, the depth is 0.4-1.1 m. The rapidness of the flow is 0.2 meters per second at the upper course and 0.4 meters per second at the lower course.

Following ponds are dammed on the Liaudė river: Pociūnėliai pond, Rūtakiemis pond, Žibartoniai 1st pond, Žibartoniai 2nd pond.

The hydronym Liaudė is of obscure origin, possible explanation is from the root *laud- (as  'people, crowd') or it could be of the Finno-Ugric origin (ex.  'moist').

References

 LIETUVOS RESPUBLIKOS UPIŲ IR TVENKINIŲ KLASIFIKATORIUS (Republic of Lithuania- River and Pond Classifications).  Ministry of Environment (Lithuania). Accessed 2011-11-17.

Rivers of Lithuania
Kėdainiai District Municipality
Radviliškis District Municipality
Panevėžys District Municipality